Galina Ivanovna Klimova (born 23 August 1942) is a retired Russian rower who won a European title in the coxed fours in 1966.

References

1942 births
Living people
Russian female rowers
Soviet female rowers
European Rowing Championships medalists
Sportspeople from Smolensk Oblast